Don Coleman (January 14, 1893 – December 16, 1985) was an American film actor. He starred in westerns released by Pathe Exchange during the silent era such as The Black Ace.

Selected filmography
 Border Blackbirds (1927)
 The Bronc Stomper (1928)
 The Boss of Rustler's Roost (1928)
 The Apache Raider (1928)
 The Black Ace (1928)
 .45 Calibre War (1929)

References

Bibliography
 Munden, Kenneth White. The American Film Institute Catalog of Motion Pictures Produced in the United States, Part 1. University of California Press, 1997.

External links

1893 births
1985 deaths
American male film actors
American male silent film actors
20th-century American male actors
People from Wyoming